The 2021–22 VTB United League was the 13th season of the VTB United League. It was the 9th season that the league functions as the Russian domestic first tier level. Two teams left the league mid-season because of the 2022 Russian invasion of Ukraine.

Teams
A total of 10 teams from three countries contest the league, including eight sides from Russia, one from Belarus, and one from Kazakhstan.

BC Khimki didn't apply for this season because of the financial difficulties.

On 24 February 2022, Estonian club Kalev/Cramo terminated their membership in the VTB United League in protest against the Russian invasion of Ukraine. The next day the league confirmed receiving declaration letter from the club. On 25 February, Polish club Zielona Góra also suspended their participation in the competition. On 1 March, VTB United League released a statement "Zielona Góra has suspended participation in the League at the moment, the next three home games have been postponed".

Venues and locations

Regular season
In the regular season, teams play against each other twice (home-and-away) in a round-robin format.

Standings

Results

Playoffs
Quarterfinals, semifinals, and bronze medal series were played in a best-of-five format (2-2-1). Finals were played in a best-of-seven format (2-2-1-1-1).

Bracket

Quarterfinals

|}

Semifinals

|}

Bronze medal series

|}

Finals

|}

VTB League teams in European competitions

Awards

Season awards

MVP of the Month

References

External links 

 Official website

 
2021–22
2021–22 in European basketball leagues
2021–22 in Russian basketball
2021–22 in Estonian basketball
2021–22 in Belarusian basketball
2021–22 in Kazakhstani basketball
2021–22 in Polish basketball